The President of the National Council is the presiding officer of the National Council, the lower house of the Austrian Parliament.

Since December 2017 Wolfgang Sobotka (ÖVP) has served as the current President of the National Council, Doris Bures (SPÖ) as the Second President and Norbert Hofer (FPÖ) as the Third. All three Presidents together form the Presidium of the National Council.

In the Austrian order of precedence the President of the National Council places after the President and before the Chancellor.

Election 
The President, the second and the third President are elected by the majority of the National Council at the beginning of each legislative session.

The Presidium even remains active after the dissolution of the National Council, until the Council obtains its new elected leadership. This also applies if the President of the former legislative session has no mandate in the new session.

In the second republic it became a political practice, that the most powerful party receives the President and the second and third most powerful party the second and third president.

Tasks and duties 
The exact tasks of the President and his deputies are determined in the Nationalratsgeschäftsordnung. He is in charge of the administrative affairs of the National Council and creates a budget concept for the Council with the second and third President. The President is the representative of national council for the public and has to ensure moderation and balanced rights. He handles the Geschäftsordnung and has to guarantee for its observance (especially for the maintenance silence and order and the meeting hall), he exercises the Hausrecht in the Austrian Parliament Building and heads the parliamentary directorate.

The three Presidents and the parliamentary leaders together form the Präsidialkonferenz,  a communicative organisation responsible for amiable cooperation under the parties within the Council.

The Presidium assumes the tasks of the Federal President in case of a longer during prevention or permanent suspension, for example because of death, a resignation or a deposition. This should ensure that overseeing tasks towards the Government and other duties are not lost.

Termination

List of officeholders

List of presidents
National Assembly

First Austrian Republic

Source: 

Second Republic

Source:

List of second presidents

First Austrian Republic

Second Republic

List of third presidents
 
First Austrian Republic

Second Republic

See also
Politics of Austria

References

Lists of political office-holders in Austria
Government of Austria
Austrian_Parliament